Sheikh Bentounès born Khaled Bentounès is the current Sufi Master of the Alawiya (officially Shadhiliyah-Darqawiya-Alawiya) Sufi Tariqat which was founded by Sheikh Ahmad al-Alawi in Algeria in 1914. He was born in Mostaganem in 1949. He is the founder of the Muslim Scouts of France. He was a central influence in the works of Éric Geoffroy. He is initiator of the International Day of Living Together in Peace on 16 May every year. This day was unanimously declared by all 193 member states of the United Nations on 8 December 2017.

Activities
An actor of Interfaith dialogue the Sheikh Bentounès founded the Muslim Scouts of France which headed the entire Fédération du Scoutisme Français until 2012. He was also a founder of the French Council of the Muslim Faith. He met with Pope John Paul II in Assisi in 1989.

Books
 Khaled Bentounès, Bruno Solt La fraternité en héritage: histoire d'une confrérie soufie Albin Michel, 2009
 Khaled Bentounès Thérapie de l'âme Koutoubia 2009
 Khaled Bentounès, Bruno Solt, Romana Solt, Christian Delorme Le Soufisme, Coeur de l'Islam La Table ronde, 1999
 Gérard Israël, Alain Houziaux, Khaled Bentounès Le Coran, Jésus et le judaïsme Desclée de Brouwer 2004

References

1949 births
Algerian Sufis
Living people
People from Mostaganem